Lorne Campbell Webster (September 30, 1871 – September 27, 1941) was a financier and political figure in Quebec. He sat for Stadacona division in the Senate of Canada from 1920 to 1941.

He was born in Quebec City and educated at Quebec High School and Montmagny College. He entered the family fuel oil business and later founded or bought many companies. Of note, Canadian Oil Companies Ltd. during the Great Depression. He died in office at the age of 69.

A grandson also named Lorne Webster (Lorne Charles Webster) was likewise ambitious, forming his own company Prenor Group which had investments in insurance, trust services, real estate and investment services. He was a director of Bank of Montreal, Domtar, Murphy Oil, Quebecor and Dale-Ross Holdings. He also was a co-founding director and partial owner of the Montreal Expos (a Major League Baseball team no longer in existence.)

References

External links 
 Portraits of Lorne Campbell Webster in the National Portrait Gallery in London

Conservative Party of Canada (1867–1942) senators
Canadian senators from Quebec
1871 births
1941 deaths